

Events

Pre-1600
 314 – Constantine I defeats Roman Emperor Licinius, who loses his European territories.
 451 – The first session of the Council of Chalcedon begins.
 876 – Frankish forces led by Louis the Younger prevent a West Frankish invasion and defeat emperor Charles II ("the Bald").
1075 – Dmitar Zvonimir is crowned King of Croatia.
1200 – Isabella of Angoulême is crowned Queen consort of England.
1322 – Mladen II Šubić of Bribir is deposed as the Croatian Ban after the Battle of Bliska.
1480 – The Great Stand on the Ugra River puts an end to Tartar rule over Moscow
1573 – End of the Spanish siege of Alkmaar, the first Dutch victory in the Eighty Years' War.

1601–1900
1645 – Jeanne Mance opens the first lay hospital of North America in Montreal.
1813 – The Treaty of Ried is signed between Bavaria and Austria.
1821 – The Peruvian Navy is established during the War of Independence.
1829 – Stephenson's Rocket wins the Rainhill Trials.
1856 – The Second Opium War between several western powers and China begins with the Arrow Incident.
1862 – American Civil War: The Confederate invasion of Kentucky is halted at the Battle of Perryville.
1871 – Slash-and-burn land management, months of drought, and the passage of a strong cold front cause the Peshtigo Fire, the Great Chicago Fire and the Great Michigan Fires to break out.
1879 – War of the Pacific: The Chilean Navy defeats the Peruvian Navy in the Battle of Angamos.
1895 – Korean Empress Myeongseong is assassinated by Japanese infiltrators.

1901–present
1912 – The First Balkan War begins when Montenegro declares war against the Ottoman Empire.
1918 – World War I: Corporal Alvin C. York kills 28 German soldiers and captures 132 for which he was awarded the Medal of Honor.
1921 – KDKA in Pittsburgh's Forbes Field conducts the first live broadcast of a football game.
1939 – World War II: Germany annexes western Poland.
1941 – World War II: During the preliminaries of the Battle of Rostov, German forces reach the Sea of Azov with the capture of Mariupol.
1943 – World War II: Around 30 civilians are executed by Friedrich Schubert's paramilitary group in Kallikratis, Crete.
1944 – World War II: Captain Bobbie Brown earns a Medal of Honor for his actions during the Battle of Crucifix Hill, just outside Aachen.
1952 – The Harrow and Wealdstone rail crash kills 112 people.
1956 – The New York Yankees's Don Larsen pitches the only perfect game in a World Series.
1962 – Der Spiegel publishes an article disclosing the sorry state of the Bundeswehr, and is soon accused of treason.
1967 – Guerrilla leader Che Guevara and his men are captured in Bolivia.
1969 – The opening rally of the Days of Rage occurs, organized by the Weather Underground in Chicago.
1970 – Aleksandr Solzhenitsyn wins the Nobel Prize in literature.
1973 – Yom Kippur War: Israel loses more than 150 tanks in a failed attack on Egyptian-occupied positions.
  1973   – Spyros Markezinis begins his 48-day term as prime minister in an abortive attempt to lead Greece to parliamentary rule.
1974 – Franklin National Bank collapses due to fraud and mismanagement; at the time it is the largest bank failure in the history of the United States.
1978 – Australia's Ken Warby sets the current world water speed record of 275.97 knots at Blowering Dam, Australia.
1982 – Poland bans Solidarity and all other trade unions.
  1982   – After its London premiere, Cats opens on Broadway and runs for nearly 18 years before closing on September 10, 2000.
1990 – First Intifada: Israeli police kill 17 Palestinians and wound over 100 near the Dome of the Rock.
1991 – Upon the expiration of the Brioni Agreement, Croatia and Slovenia sever all official relations with Yugoslavia.
2001 – A twin engine Cessna and a Scandinavian Airlines System jetliner collide in heavy fog during takeoff from Milan, Italy, killing 118 people.
  2001   – U.S. President George W. Bush announces the establishment of the Office of Homeland Security.
2005 – The 7.6  Kashmir earthquake leaves 86,000–87,351 people dead, 69,000–75,266 injured, and 2.8 million homeless.
2014 – Thomas Eric Duncan, the first person in the United States to be diagnosed with Ebola, dies.
2016 – In the wake of Hurricane Matthew, the death toll rises to nearly 900.
2019 – About 200 Extinction Rebellion activists block the gates of Leinster House (parliament) in the Republic of Ireland.
2020 – Second Nagorno-Karabakh War: Azerbaijan twice deliberately targeted the Church of the Holy Savior Ghazanchetsots of Shusha.

Births

Pre-1600
319 BC – Pyrrhus of Epirus (d. 272 BC)
1150 – Narapatisithu, king of Burma (d. 1211)
1515 – Margaret Douglas, daughter of Archibald Douglas (d. 1578)
1551 – Giulio Caccini, Italian composer (d. 1618)
1553 – Jacques Auguste de Thou, French historian (d. 1617)
1585 – Heinrich Schütz, German organist and composer (d. 1672)

1601–1900
1609 – John Clarke, English physician (d. 1676)
1676 – Benito Jerónimo Feijóo y Montenegro, Spanish monk and scholar (d. 1764)
1713 – Yechezkel Landau, Polish rabbi and author (d. 1793)
1715 – Michel Benoist, French scientist and missionary (d. 1774)
1747 – Jean-François Rewbell, French lawyer and politician (d. 1807)
1753 – Princess Sophia Albertina of Sweden (d. 1829)
1765 – Harman Blennerhassett, English-Irish lawyer and politician (d. 1831)
1789 – John Ruggles, American lawyer and politician (d. 1874)
  1789   – William John Swainson, English-New Zealand ornithologist and entomologist (d. 1855)
1807 – Harriet Taylor Mill, English philosopher and activist (d. 1858)
1818 – John Henninger Reagan, American judge and politician, 3rd Confederate States Secretary of the Treasury (d. 1905)
1834 – Walter Kittredge, American violinist and composer (d. 1905)
1845 – Salomon Kalischer, German pianist, composer, and physicist (d. 1924)
1847 – Rose Scott, Australian activist (d. 1925)
1848 – Pierre De Geyter, Belgian composer (d. 1932)
1850 – Henry Louis Le Châtelier, French chemist and academic (d. 1936)
1860 – John D. Batten, British painter, printmaker and illustrator (d. 1932)
1863 – Edythe Chapman, American actress (d. 1948)
1864 – Ozias Leduc, Canadian painter and educator (d. 1955)
1870 – Louis Vierne, French organist and composer (d. 1937)
1872 – Mary Engle Pennington, American bacteriological chemist and refrigeration engineer (d. 1952)
1873 – Ejnar Hertzsprung, Danish chemist and astronomer (d. 1967)
  1873   – Alexey Shchusev, Russian architect and academic, designed Lenin's Mausoleum (d. 1949)
1875 – Laurence Doherty, English tennis player and golfer (d. 1919)
1876 – Frederick Montague, 1st Baron Amwell, English lieutenant and politician (d. 1966)
1877 – Hans Heysen, German-Australian painter (d. 1968)
1879 – Huntley Gordon, Canadian-American actor (d. 1956)
1882 – Harry McClintock, American singer-songwriter and poet (d. 1957)
1883 – Dick Burnett, American singer-songwriter and guitarist (d. 1977)
  1883   – Otto Heinrich Warburg, German physiologist and physician, Nobel Prize laureate (d. 1970)
1884 – Walther von Reichenau, German field marshal (d. 1942)
1887 – Ping Bodie, American baseball player (d. 1961)
  1887   – Donie Bush, American baseball player, manager, and team owner (d. 1972)
1888 – Ernst Kretschmer, German psychiatrist and author (d. 1964)
1889 – R. Fraser Armstrong, Canadian engineer (d. 1983)
  1889   – Collett E. Woolman, American businessman, co-founded Delta Air Lines (d. 1966)
1890 – Snuffy Browne, Barbadian cricketer (d. 1964)
  1890   – Eddie Rickenbacker, American soldier and pilot, Medal of Honor recipient (d. 1973)
  1890   – Philippe Thys, Belgian cyclist (d. 1971)
1892 – Marina Tsvetaeva, Russian poet and author (d. 1941)
1893 – Clarence Williams, American pianist and composer (d. 1965)
1895 – Zog I of Albania (d. 1961)
  1895   – Juan Perón, Argentinian general and politician, 29th President of Argentina (d. 1974)
1896 – Julien Duvivier, French director, producer, and screenwriter (d. 1967)
1897 – Rouben Mamoulian, Georgian-American director and screenwriter (d. 1987)
  1897   – Marcel Herrand, French actor (d. 1953)

1901–present
1901 – Eivind Groven, Norwegian composer and theorist (d. 1977)
  1901   – Mark Oliphant, Australian physicist, humanitarian and politician, Governor of South Australia (d. 2000)
1903 – Georgy Geshev, Bulgarian chess player (d. 1937)
1904 – Yves Giraud-Cabantous, French race car driver (d. 1973)
1907 – Richard Sharpe Shaver, American author and illustrator (d. 1975)
1908 – Ezekias Papaioannou, Greek-Cypriot politician (d. 1988)
1910 – Kirk Alyn, American actor (d. 1999)
  1910   – Paulette Dubost, French actress (d. 2011)
  1910   – Gus Hall, American soldier and politician (d. 2000)
  1910   – Helmut Kallmeyer, German chemist and soldier (d. 2006)
  1910   – Ray Lewis, Canadian runner (d. 2003)
1913 – Robert R. Gilruth, American pilot and engineer (d. 2000)
  1913   – Marios Makrionitis, Roman Catholic Archbishop of Athens (d. 1959)
1917 – Billy Conn, American boxer (d. 1993)
  1917   – Walter Lord, American historian and author (d. 2002)
  1917   – Danny Murtaugh, American baseball player, coach, and manager (d. 1976)
  1917   – Rodney Robert Porter, English biochemist and physiologist, Nobel Prize laureate (d. 1985)
1918 – Halfdan Hegtun, Norwegian radio host and politician (d. 2012)
  1918   – Jens Christian Skou, Danish chemist and physiologist, Nobel Prize laureate (d. 2018)
1919 – Jack McGrath, American race car driver (d. 1955)
  1919   – Kiichi Miyazawa, Japanese politician, 78th Prime Minister of Japan (d. 2007)
1920 – Frank Herbert, American journalist, photographer, and author (d. 1986)
1921 – Abraham Sarmiento, Filipino lawyer and jurist (d. 2010)
1922 – Nils Liedholm, Swedish footballer, coach, and manager (d. 2007)
  1922   – Herbert B. Leonard, American production manager and producer (d. 2006)
1924 – Alphons Egli, Swiss lawyer and politician, 77th President of the Swiss Confederation (d. 2016)
  1924   – Aloísio Lorscheider, Brazilian cardinal (d. 2007)
  1924   – Thirunalloor Karunakaran, Indian poet and scholar (d. 2006)
  1924   – John Nelder, English mathematician and statistician (d. 2010)
1925 – Álvaro Magaña, Salvadoran economist and politician, President of El Salvador (d. 2001)
1926 – Raaj Kumar, Indian police officer and actor (d. 1996)
1927 – Jim Elliot, American missionary and translator (d. 1956)
  1927   – César Milstein, Argentinian-English biochemist and academic, Nobel Prize laureate (d. 2002)
1928 – Didi, Brazilian footballer and manager (d. 2001)
  1928   – M. Russell Ballard, American lieutenant and religious leader
  1928   – Neil Harvey, Australian cricketer
  1928   – Bill Maynard, English actor (d. 2018)
1929 – Betty Boothroyd, English academic and politician, British Speaker of the House of Commons
1930 – Pepper Adams, American saxophonist and composer (d. 1986)
  1930   – Alasdair Milne, Indian-English director and producer (d. 2013)
  1930   – Faith Ringgold, American painter and activist
  1930   – Toru Takemitsu, Japanese composer and theorist (d. 1996)
1931 – Bill Brown, Scottish-Canadian footballer (d. 2004)
1932 – Ray Reardon, Welsh snooker player and police officer
1934 – Kader Asmal, South African academic and politician (d. 2011)
  1934   – Gerry Hitchens, English footballer and manager (d. 1983)
  1934   – James Holshouser, American lawyer and politician, 68th Governor of North Carolina (d. 2013)
1935 – Albert Roux, French-English chef (d. 2021)
1936 – Rona Barrett, American journalist and businesswoman
1937 – Merle Park, British ballerina and educator
  1937   – Paul Schell, American lawyer and politician, 50th Mayor of Seattle (d. 2014)
1938 – William Corlett, English author and playwright (d. 2005)
  1938   – Walter Gretzky, Canadian ice hockey coach and author (d. 2021)
  1938   – Fred Stolle, Australian-American tennis player and sportscaster
  1938   – Bronislovas Lubys, Lithuanian businessman and politician, Prime Minister of Lithuania (d. 2011)
1939 – Paul Hogan, Australian actor, producer, and screenwriter
1939 – Elvīra Ozoliņa, Latvian javelin thrower
  1939   – Harvey Pekar, American author and critic (d. 2010)
  1939   – Lynne Stewart, American lawyer and criminal (d. 2017)
1940 – Fred Cash, American soul singer
1941 – Jesse Jackson, American minister and activist
  1941   – Shane Stevens, American author (d. 2007)
  1941   – George Bellamy, English singer, guitarist, and producer
1942 – Stanley Bates, English actor and screenwriter
1943 – Chevy Chase, American comedian, actor, and screenwriter
  1943   – R. L. Stine, American author, screenwriter, and producer
1944 – Ed Kirkpatrick, American baseball player (d. 2010)
  1944   – Susan Raye, American country music singer 
1946 – Hanan Ashrawi, Palestinian scholar, activist, and politician
  1946   – Jean-Jacques Beineix, French director and producer (d. 2022)
  1946   – Dennis Kucinich, American journalist and politician, 53rd Mayor of Cleveland
  1946   – Bel Mooney, English journalist and author
  1946   – Jon Ekerold, South African motorcycle racer
1947 – Richard Morris, English archaeologist, historian, and author
  1947   – Emiel Puttemans, Belgian runner
  1947   – Stephen Shore, American photographer and educator
  1947   – Bill Zorn, folk musician
1948 – Benjamin Cheever, American journalist and author
  1948   – Claude Jade, French actress (d. 2006)
  1948   – Johnny Ramone, American guitarist and songwriter  (d. 2004)
1949 – Hamish Stuart, Scottish singer-songwriter, guitarist, and producer 
  1949   – Sigourney Weaver, American actress and producer
1950 – Robert "Kool" Bell, American singer-songwriter and bass player 
  1950   – Blake Morrison, English poet, author, and academic
1951 – Jack O'Connell, American educator and politician
  1951   – Timo Salonen, Finnish race car driver
  1951   – Shannon C. Stimson, American philosopher, historian, and theorist
1952 – Takis Koroneos, Greek basketball player and coach
  1952   – Jan Marijnissen, Dutch journalist and politician
  1952   – Edward Zwick, American director, producer, and screenwriter
1953 – Robert Saxton, English composer and educator
1954 – Huub Rothengatter, Dutch race car driver and manager
1955 – Bill Elliott, American race car driver
  1955   – Alain Ferté, French race car driver
  1955   – Darrell Hammond, American comedian and actor
  1955   – Paul Lennon, Australian politician, 42nd Premier of Tasmania
  1955   – Lonnie Pitchford, American singer and guitarist (d. 1998)
1956 – Jeff Lahti, American baseball player
  1956   – Janice E. Voss, American engineer and astronaut (d. 2012)
1957 – Antonio Cabrini, Italian footballer and manager
1958 – Steve Coll, American journalist and author
  1958   – Bret Lott, American  journalist, author, and academic
  1958   – Ursula von der Leyen, Belgian-German physician and politician, Defense Minister of Germany
  1958   – Ruffin McNeill, American football player and coach
1959 – Tommy Armour III, American golfer
  1959   – Nick Bakay, American actor, producer, and screenwriter
  1959   – Gavin Friday, Irish singer-songwriter, actor, and producer 
  1959   – Erik Gundersen, Danish motorcycle racer
  1959   – Peter Horrocks, English journalist and producer
  1959   – Mike Morgan, American baseball player and coach
  1959   – Carlos I. Noriega, Peruvian-American colonel and astronaut
1960 – Andrea Anastasi, Italian volleyball player and coach
  1960   – Reed Hastings, American businessman, co-founded Netflix
  1960   – Rano Karno, Indonesian actor and politician
  1960   – Ralf Minge, German footballer and manager
  1960   – François Pérusse, Canadian singer-songwriter and comedian
  1960   – Mike Teague, English rugby player
1961 – Steven Bernstein, American trumpet player and composer 
  1961   – Jon Stevens, New Zealand-Australian singer-songwriter
  1961   – Simon Burke, Australian actor and producer
  1961   – Ted Kooshian, American pianist and composer 
1962 – Richard Lintern, British actor
  1962   – Bruno Thiry, Belgian race car driver
  1962   – Chen Xiaoxia, Chinese diver
1963 – Steve Perry, American ska singer-songwriter and guitarist
1964 – Jakob Arjouni, German author (d. 2013)
  1964   – Ian Hart, English actor
  1964   – CeCe Winans, American singer-songwriter 
1965 – Matt Biondi, American swimmer and coach
  1965   – Ardal O'Hanlon, Irish comedian, actor, and screenwriter
  1965   – Harri Koskela, Finnish wrestler
  1965   – C. J. Ramone, American singer-songwriter and bass player 
1966 – Art Barr, American wrestler (d. 1994)
  1966   – Karyn Parsons, American actress and producer
1967 – Yvonne Reyes, Venezuelan television host and actress
  1967   – Teddy Riley, American singer-songwriter and producer 
1968 – Ali Benarbia, Algerian footballer
  1968   – Zvonimir Boban, Croatian footballer and sportscaster
  1968   – Emily Procter, American actress
  1968   – CL Smooth, American rapper and producer 
  1968   – Leeroy Thornhill, English keyboard player and DJ 
1969 – Jeremy Davies, American actor
  1969   – Dylan Neal, Canadian-American actor, producer, and screenwriter
1970 – Mathieu Ngudjolo Chui, Congolese colonel
  1970   – Matt Damon, American actor, producer, and screenwriter
  1970   – Anne-Marie Duff, English actress
  1970   – Sadiq Khan, English lawyer and politician, Minister of State for Transport, Mayor of London
  1970   – Sisaundra Lewis, American singer-songwriter and producer
  1970   – Tetsuya Nomura, Japanese video game designer and director
1971 – Marc Ellis, New Zealand rugby player and television host
  1971   – David Gauke, English lawyer and politician
  1971   – Pınar Selek, Turkish sociologist, author, and academic
  1971   – Monty Williams, American basketball player and coach
1972 – Terry Balsamo, American guitarist and songwriter 
  1972   – Stanislav Varga, Slovak footballer and manager
1973 – Jim Fairchild, American singer-songwriter and guitarist 
  1973   – Kari Korhonen, Finnish cartoonist
1974 – Kevyn Adams, American ice hockey player and coach
  1974   – Fredrik Modin, Swedish ice hockey player
  1974   – Koji Murofushi, Japanese hammer thrower
1976 – Karina Bacchi, Brazilian model and actress
  1976   – Galo Blanco, Spanish tennis player and coach
  1976   – Renate Groenewold, Dutch speed skater and cyclist
1977 – Anne-Caroline Chausson, French cyclist
  1977   – Jamie Marchi, American voice actress, director, and screenwriter
  1977   – Erna Siikavirta, Finnish singer-songwriter and keyboard player 
1978 – Antonino D'Agostino, Italian footballer
  1978   – Mick O'Driscoll, Irish rugby player and coach
1979 – Paul Burchill, English wrestler
  1979   – Gregori Chad Petree, American singer-songwriter and guitarist 
1980 – Nick Cannon, American actor, rapper, and producer
1981 – Vladimir Kisenkov, Russian footballer 
  1981   – Raffi Torres, Canadian ice hockey player
1982 – Phil Mustard, English cricketer
  1982   – Miloš Pavlović, Serbian race car driver
  1982   – Annemiek van Vleuten, Dutch cyclist
1983 – Mario Cassano, Italian footballer
  1983   – Michael Fraser, Scottish footballer
  1983   – Mihkel Kukk, Estonian javelin thrower
  1983   – Abhishek Nayar, Indian cricketer
  1983   – Travis Pastrana, American motorcycle racer
1984 – Domenik Hixon, American football player
1985 – Bruno Mars, American singer-songwriter, producer, and actor
  1985   – Eiji Wentz, Japanese singer-songwriter
  1985   – Elliphant, Swedish singer-songwriter and rapper
1986 – Louis Dodds, English footballer
  1986   – Michele Sepe, Italian rugby player
1987 – Frankie Brown, Scottish footballer
  1987   – Aya Hirano, Japanese voice actress and singer
  1987   – Hassan Maatouk, Lebanese footballer
  1987   – Taylor Price, American football player
1989 – Sione Lousi, New Zealand rugby league player
  1989   – Mahmut Temür, Turkish footballer
  1989   – Armand Traoré, French footballer
1990 – Rachel Klamer, Zimbabwean-Dutch triathlete
1991 – Jordan McLean, Australian rugby league player
1992 – Maria João Koehler, Portuguese tennis player
  1992   – Lidziya Marozava, Belarusian tennis player
  1992   – Terran Petteway, American basketball player
1993 – Garbiñe Muguruza, Spanish tennis player
  1993   – Barbara Palvin, Hungarian model and actress
  1993   – Molly Quinn, American actress and producer
  1993   – Darrell Wallace Jr., American race car driver
1996 – Sara Sorribes Tormo, Spanish tennis player
  1996   – Sara Takanashi, Japanese ski jumper
1997 – Fernanda Contreras Gómez, Mexican tennis player
  1997   – Bella Thorne, American actress
1999 – Putthipong Assaratanakul, Thai actor and singer
  1999   – Camila Rossi, Brazilian rhythmic gymnast
2002 – Qinwen Zheng, Chinese tennis player

Deaths

Pre-1600
 705 – Abd al-Malik ibn Marwan, Muslim caliph (b. 646)
 923 – Pilgrim I, archbishop of Salzburg 
 951 – Xiao Sagezhi, Chinese Khitan empress
 976 – Helen of Zadar, queen consort of the Kingdom of Croatia 
1281 – Princess Constance of Greater Poland (b. c.1245)
1286 – John I, Duke of Brittany (b. 1217)
1317 – Emperor Fushimi of Japan (b. 1265)
1354 – Cola di Rienzo, Roman tribune (b. c.1313)
1361 – John Beauchamp, 3rd Baron Beauchamp
1436 – Jacqueline, Countess of Hainaut (b. 1401)
1469 – Filippo Lippi, artist (b. 1406)
1594 – Ishikawa Goemon, ninja and thief of Japan (b. 1558)

1601–1900
1621 – Antoine de Montchrestien, French soldier, playwright, and economist (b. 1575)
1647 – Christen Sørensen Longomontanus, Danish astronomer and mathematician (b. 1562)
1652 – John Greaves, English mathematician and astronomer (b. 1602)
1656 – John George I, Elector of Saxony (b. 1585)
1659 – Jean de Quen, French missionary, priest, and historian (b. 1603)
1735 – Yongzheng Emperor of China (b. 1678)
1754 – Henry Fielding,  English novelist and playwright (b. 1707)
1772 – Jean-Joseph de Mondonville, French violinist and composer (b. 1711)
1793 – John Hancock, American merchant and politician, 1st Governor of Massachusetts (b. 1737)
1795 – Andrew Kippis, English minister and author (b. 1725)
1802 – Emmanuele Vitale, Maltese general and politician (b. 1758)
1804 – Thomas Cochran, Canadian lawyer and judge (b. 1777)
1809 – James Elphinston, Scottish orthographer, phonologist, and linguist (b. 1721)
1821 – Juan O'Donojú, last Spanish ruler of Mexico (b. 1762)
1834 – François-Adrien Boieldieu, French composer (b. 1775)
1869 – Franklin Pierce, American general, lawyer, and politician, 14th President of the United States (b. 1804)
1879 – Miguel Grau Seminario, Peruvian admiral (b. 1834)
1886 – Austin F. Pike, American lawyer and politician (b. 1819)
1897 – Alexei Savrasov, Russian painter and academic (b. 1830)

1901–present
1928 – Larry Semon, American actor, director, producer, and screenwriter (b. 1889)
1931 – John Monash, Australian general and engineer (b. 1865)
1936 – Premchand, Indian author and screenwriter (b. 1880)
  1936   – Red Ames, American baseball player and manager (b. 1882)
  1936   – Ahmet Tevfik Pasha, Ottoman politician, 292nd Grand Vizier of the Ottoman Empire (b. 1845)
  1936   – William Henry Stark, American businessman (b. 1851)
1942 – Sergey Chaplygin, Russian physicist, mathematician, and engineer (b. 1869)
1944 – Wendell Willkie, American captain, lawyer, and politician (b. 1892)
1945 – Felix Salten, Austrian author and critic (b. 1869)
1952 – Joe Adams, American baseball player and manager (b. 1877)
1953 – Nigel Bruce, British actor (b. 1895)
  1953   – Kathleen Ferrier, English soprano (b. 1912)
1955 – Iry LeJeune, American accordion player (b. 1928)
1958 – Ran Bosilek, Bulgarian author and translator (b. 1886)
1963 – Remedios Varo, Spanish-Mexican painter (b. 1908)
1967 – Clement Attlee, English soldier, lawyer, and politician, Prime Minister of the United Kingdom (b. 1883)
1970 – Jean Giono, French author and poet (b. 1895)
1973 – Gabriel Marcel, French philosopher, playwright, and critic (b. 1889)
1977 – Giorgos Papasideris, Greek singer-songwriter (b. 1902)
1978 – Bertha Parker Pallan, American archaeologist (b. 1907)
1979 – Brian Edmund Baker, English air marshal (b. 1896)
  1979   – Jayaprakash Narayan, Indian politician (b. 1902)
1982 – Fernando Lamas, Argentinian-American actor and director (b. 1916)
  1982   – Philip Noel-Baker, Baron Noel-Baker, English runner and politician, Secretary of State for Commonwealth Relations, Nobel Prize laureate (b. 1889)
1983 – Joan Hackett, American actress (b. 1934)
1985 – Malcolm Ross, American captain, physicist, and balloonist (b. 1919)
  1985   – Gordon Welchman, English-American mathematician and scholar (b. 1906)
1987 – Konstantinos Tsatsos, Greek scholar and politician, 2nd President of Greece (b. 1899)
1992 – Willy Brandt, German lawyer and politician, 4th Chancellor of Germany, Nobel Prize laureate (b. 1913)
1994 – Oscar M. Ruebhausen, American lawyer (b. 1912)
1995 – Christopher Keene, American conductor and educator (b. 1946)
1997 – Bertrand Goldberg, American architect, designed the Marina City Building (b. 1913)
1999 – John McLendon, American basketball player and coach (b. 1915)
2000 – Charlotte Lamb, English author (b. 1937)
2001 – Dmitry Polyansky, First Deputy Premier of the Soviet Union (b. 1917)
2002 – Phyllis Calvert, English actress (b. 1915)
  2002   – Jacques Richard, Canadian ice hockey player (b. 1952)
2004 – James Chace, American historian and author (b. 1931)
2006 – Mark Porter, New Zealand race car driver (b. 1974)
2007 – Constantine Andreou, Greek painter and sculptor (b. 1917)
2008 – Ângelo Carvalho, Portuguese footballer (b. 1925)
  2008   – Bob Friend, English journalist (b. 1938)
  2008   – Eileen Herlie, Scottish-American actress (b. 1918)
  2008   – George Emil Palade, Romanian-American biologist and physician, Nobel Prize laureate (b. 1912)
2010 – Frank Bourgholtzer, American journalist (b. 1919)
  2010   – Eileen Crofton, British physician and author (b. 1919)
2011 – Al Davis, American football player, coach, and manager (b. 1929)
  2011   – Mikey Welsh, American guitarist and painter (b. 1971)
  2011   – Roger Williams, American pianist (b. 1924)
2012 – Varsha Bhosle, Indian singer and journalist (b. 1956)
  2012   – Marilou Diaz-Abaya, Filipino director, producer, and screenwriter (b. 1955)
  2012   – Eric Lomax, Scottish captain and author (b. 1919)
  2012   – Nawal Kishore Sharma, Indian politician, 20th Governor of Gujarat (b. 1925)
2013 – Philip Chevron, Irish singer-songwriter and guitarist (b. 1957)
  2013   – Paul Desmarais, Canadian businessman and philanthropist (b. 1927)
  2013   – Rod Grams, American journalist and politician (b. 1948)
  2013   – Rodolphe Kasser, Swiss archaeologist and philologist (b. 1927)
  2013   – Andy Pafko, American baseball player and manager (b. 1921)
  2013   – Akong Rinpoche, Tibetan-Chinese spiritual leader (b. 1939)
2014 – Morris Lurie, Australian author and playwright (b. 1938)
  2014   – Alden E. Matthews, American missionary (b. 1921)
  2014   – Harden M. McConnell, American chemist and academic (b. 1927)
  2014   – Zilpha Keatley Snyder, American author (b. 1927)
  2014   – Jeen van den Berg, Dutch speed skater (b. 1928)
2015 – Richard Davies, Welsh-English actor (b. 1926)
  2015   – Jim Diamond, Scottish singer-songwriter (b. 1951)
  2015   – Dennis Eichhorn, American author and illustrator (b. 1945)
  2015   – Lindy Infante, American football player and coach (b. 1940)
  2015   – Paul Prudhomme, American chef and author (b. 1940)
2020 – Whitey Ford, American professional baseball pitcher (b. 1928)

Holidays and observances
Christian feast day:
Evodus (or Yves)
Palatias and Laurentia
Pelagia (Eastern Orthodox and Roman Catholic Churches)
Reparata
San Ernesto, Che Guevara as a folk saint. (Bolivian campesinos)
Simeon (Gospel of Luke)
Thaïs
William Dwight Porter Bliss and Richard T. Ely (Episcopal Church)
October 8 (Eastern Orthodox liturgics)
World Space Week (October 4–10)
Air Force Day (India)
Arbor Day (Namibia)
Children's Day (Iran)
Navy Day (Peru)

References

External links

 
 
 

Days of the year
October